The Uniform Commercial Code (UCC) currently consists of the following articles:

Art. 1, General Provisions
Art. 2, Sales
Art. 2A, Leases
Art. 3, Negotiable Instruments
Art. 4, Bank Deposits and Collections
Art. 4A, Funds Transfer
Art. 5, Letters of Credit
Art. 6, Bulk Sales (now deprecated)
Art. 7, Documents of Title
Art. 8, Investment Securities
Art. 9, Secured Transactions

These articles have been adopted to varying degrees in the United States (U.S.) by the 50 states, District of Columbia, territories, and some Native American tribes.

UCC adoption summary
The following table identifies which articles in the UCC each U.S. jurisdiction has currently adopted.  However, it does not make any distinctions for the various official revisions to the UCC, the selection of official alternative language offered in the UCC, or unofficial changes made to the UCC by some jurisdictions.

UCC adoption legal citations
The following list provides legal citations for each U.S. jurisdiction's adoption of articles in the UCC.

Commercial
Uniform Commercial Code